Gréta Arn was the defending champion, but chose not to participate.

Katherine Sebov won the title, defeating Quirine Lemoine in the final, 7–6(12–10), 7–6(7–4).

Seeds

Draw

Finals

Top half

Bottom half

References
Main Draw

Challenger Banque Nationale de Saguenay - Singles
Challenger de Saguenay